Eaglesomia eaglesomei is an extinct species of catfish (order Siluriformes) of the family Claroteidae.

References

Claroteidae
Fish described in 1926